Orophia zernyi is a species of moth in the family Depressariidae. It was described by Szent-Ivany in 1942. The species is found in Croatia.

References

Moths described in 1942
Orophia